Nuit d'ivresse (Night of drunkenness)  is a 1986 French cult comedy film directed by Bernard Nauer and starring Josiane Balasko and Thierry Lhermitte. It was adapted from the play of the same name, created in 1985 by Balasko and Michel Blanc.

Plot
Jacques Belin, a famous TV gameshow host, awaits his fiancée on New Year's Eve in the café of the Gare de l'Est in Paris. When she fails to show up, he meets a woman named Frède, a charmless and rather vulgar woman, just out of prison, who is drinking the night away while waiting for her morning train to Metz where she is going to live with her sister. Complete opposites, Jacques and Frède's respective solitudes bring them together as they talk and drink. An eventful and unforgettable evening follows ...

Cast

 Josiane Balasko as Frède
 Thierry Lhermitte as Jacques Belin
 Jean-Michel Dupuis as Steve
 Viviane Elbaz as Marlène
 Gérard Jugnot as himself
 Victoria Abril as Jugnot's wife
 Marc Dudicourt as President Bulot
 Daniel Dadzu  as Auguste
 Alain Doutey as Jean-François Ragain
 Daniel Jégou as M.A. Ammou
 Sylvie Novak as Valérie Ammou
 France Roche as herself
 Ticky Holgado as France Roche's technician
 Bruno Moynot as France Roche's cameraman

Play

 1985–1988: with Josiane Balasko, Michel Blanc & Jean-François Dérec, directed by Josiane Balasko & Michel Blanc, Le Splendid
 2002: with Michèle Bernier, Francis Huster, Pascal Légitimus, Christian Sinniger & Marilou Berry directed by Josiane Balasko, Théâtre de la Renaissance
 2014–16: with Larra Mendy, Loïc Rojouan & Stéphane Caudéran, directed by Xavier Viton, Café-théâtre des Beaux-arts
 2015–16: with Élisabeth Buffet, Denis Maréchal & Jean-Christophe Barc, directed by Dominique Guillo, Tour
 2017: with Jean-Luc Reichmann

References

External links

1986 films
1986 comedy films
French comedy films
1980s French-language films
1980s French films